Pinipel Island, also known as Green Island, is the northern of the two atolls making up the Green Islands, east of New Ireland, Papua New Guinea. It is located north of Nissan Island, the southern atoll.

The namesake main island of the atoll makes up for most of its land area. In addition, there are two tiny islets in the north-western part of the atoll, Sentinel Island and Sau (Sale) Island. The population of the atoll, all on the main island, was 901 at the census of population of 2000, distributed among three villages:
Mantoia, in the north of the main island (pop. 394)
Teah (279), close east of Mantoia
Rogos, also called Rokus, in the central part of the main island (228)

References

Islands of Papua New Guinea
Geography of the Autonomous Region of Bougainville
Solomon Islands (archipelago)